Amina Khatun (fl. 1117) was de facto ruler of Aleppo in 1117.    

She was born to Fakhr al-Mulk Ridwan, Amir of Aleppo (r. 1095–1113). Her father was succeeded by her brother Alp Arslan al-Akhras under regency of Lu'lu' al-Yaya. Her brother was deposed in 1114 by Lu'lu' al-Yaya, who replaced him with her six year old younger brother Sulṭān Shāh. 

In 1117, Lu'lu' al-Yaya died. Amina Khatun seized effective control of Aleppo in the interregnum. She did not proclaim herself as regent, but she called upon the commander Yaruqtash in Damascus to come and assume the regency in Aleppo on behalf of her brother. When Yaruqtash tried to assume direct control and depose her brother, she had him arrested and exiled. Together with her sister Farkhinda Khatun, she installed Ilghazi as the new commander and regent and, eventually, as the successor of her brother. Her position as de facto keeper of the citadel and regency of Aleppo was near unique for a woman in a Muslim state of her time.

References

12th-century women rulers
12th-century Syrian people
Rulers of Aleppo
Syrian women